Tetrops brunneicornis is a species of beetle in the family Cerambycidae. It was described by Pu in 1985. It is known from China.

References

Tetropini
Beetles described in 1985